Gubbay is a surname. Notable people with the surname include:

Aline Gubbay (1920–2005), Canadian photographer, art historian, and writer
Anthony Gubbay (born 1932), Zimbabwean judge
Raymond Gubbay (born 1946), English music promoter